Players is an American crime drama television series that aired on NBC from October 17, 1997, to April 17, 1998. Co-created by Reggie Rock Bythewood, Dick Wolf and Shaun Cassidy, the series starred Ice-T, Costas Mandylor, Frank John Hughes, and Mia Korf. It was produced by Wolf Films in association with NBC and Universal Television. Players was cancelled after 18 episodes.

Synopsis
The series follows three young ex-cons who, as a part of a new FBI program, are commissioned to track down criminals.

Cast

Main
 Ice-T as Isaac "Ice" Gregory
 Costas Mandylor as Alphonse Royo
 Frank John Hughes as Charlie O'Bannon
 Mia Korf as Agt. Christine Kowalski

Recurring
 Bob McCracken as Malcolm O'Conner

Syndication
In 2008, the series began airing on the Sleuth network.

Episodes

References

External links
  on Wolf Entertainment
 
 
 Theme song

1990s American crime drama television series
1997 American television series debuts
1998 American television series endings
NBC original programming
Television series by Universal Television
English-language television shows
Television series created by Dick Wolf
Television series by Wolf Films
Television shows set in Los Angeles 
Television series created by Shaun Cassidy